United Nations Security Council resolution 682, adopted unanimously on 21 December 1990, after recalling Resolution 186 (1964) and all resolutions on Cyprus up to the most recent Resolution 680 (1990), the Council expressed its concern regarding the "chronic and ever-deepening financial crisis" facing the United Nations Peacekeeping Force in Cyprus.

In this regard, the current resolution decided to examine the problems of financing the Force and would report back by 1 June 1991 on the matter, with the view to putting into effect an alternative method of financing the Force. Members of the Council did not consider withdrawing the Force from the island, noting its necessity as a valuable peacekeeping mission.

See also
 Cyprus dispute
 List of United Nations Security Council Resolutions 601 to 700 (1987–1991)
 United Nations Buffer Zone in Cyprus
 Turkish invasion of Cyprus

References

External links
 
Text of the Resolution at undocs.org

 0682
 0682
December 1990 events
1990 in Cyprus